Ruodhaid was a mistress of Charles Martel with whom she had the following children:

 Bernard (c. 720–787)
 Hieronymus, son of Charles Martel (c. 722- after 782)
 Remigius, Archbishop of Rouen (d. 771)
 Aldana, wife of Theoderich, Count of Autun

References

8th-century deaths
Year of birth unknown
Year of death unknown
Mistresses of Frankish royalty
8th-century Frankish women